The William E. Gordon House is a historic house in Bellevue, Nebraska. It was built in 1936, and designed in the American Craftsman style. According to Stacy Stupka-Burda of the Nebraska State Historical Society, "The house has gable ends with large triangular braced decorative supports positioned under wide eaves. The gable ends feature extra stickwork. The roof is covered with wood shingles and a single large stone chimney pierces the ridgeline. The house is clad with multi-hued gray limestone veneer and the foundation is concrete block." It has been listed on the National Register of Historic Places since November 8, 2006.

References

	
National Register of Historic Places in Sarpy County, Nebraska
American Craftsman architecture in Nebraska
Houses completed in 1936